Reelz (formerly known as Reelz Channel) is an American digital cable and satellite television network owned by Hubbard Broadcasting. The network's programming was formerly devoted to entertainment-oriented programming focusing on the Hollywood film and entertainment industry, with programs featuring information on theatrical film releases as well as information on movies released on DVD and airing on cable television. Currently, outside a few entertainment programs, repeats of the Oxygen series Snapped, and some reality series and films, the network mainly airs original and acquired films, series, and documentaries about celebrity scandals.

As of February 2015, Reelz is available to approximately 68.2 million pay television households (58.6% of households with at least one television set) in the United States.

History

The network launched on September 27, 2006 as ReelzChannel, initially available on satellite providers DirecTV and Dish Network. The network originally maintained a programming focus similar to the original format of E! (and its predecessor MovieTime), focusing on programs about the entertainment industry including movie review and junket interview series. The network eventually signed carriage agreements with various cable providers including Time Warner Cable, Comcast, Charter Communications and Altice. The network's programming then was tailored to allow insertion of order details and channel positions for film titles being offered through each provider's pay-per-view and video on demand systems.

In early 2009, ReelzChannel moved its operations from Los Angeles, California, to Albuquerque, New Mexico, where Hubbard owns that city's NBC-affiliated television station KOB. KOB and ReelzChannel, however, maintain separate facilities. At that point, the network shifted its programming focus to incorporate acquired series alongside its entertainment news programs. In August 2011, ReelzChannel debuted its first miniseries, The Kennedys. An unauthorized biopic centering on President John F. Kennedy, Jackie Kennedy and the Camelot empire, ReelzChannel acquired the rights to the film after it was dropped by History.

In February 2023, Reelz reached an SVOD agreement with Peacock, which will carry an on-demand library and linear feed of Reelz programming for subscribers. MLW Underground Wrestling will be blacked out on Peacock due to an exclusivity agreement with WWE.

Programming
Reelz original programming is produced both in the US and internationally. For example, the network premiered a docudrama in 2017, Titanic: Sinking The Myths, starring Ed Asner, examining the circumstances surrounding the ocean liner disaster. In 2020, Reelz ordered The Story of the Songs from ViacomCBS Networks UK, in association with the British branch of Paramount Network. 

In June 2022, Reelz acquired On Patrol: Live, a spiritual successor to the former A&E program Live PD, 

The network's original promotional remit regarding cable and satellite pay-per-view and video on demand services, which remains in its carriage contracts, is contractually fulfilled by an occasional on-air segment hosted by a Celebrity Page personality, REELZ Recommends, and an email newsletter service, which highlights programs available via streaming video and video on demand.

Current programming
A list of shows currently airing.

Original programming

Autopsy: The Last Hours of...
Behind Closed Doors with Natalie Morales
Behind the Screams
Breaking the Band
Celebrity Damage Control
Celebrity Legacies
Celebrity Page (formerly OK!TV)
Charles Manson's Bloodline
CopyCat Killers
Demons in the City of Angels
Executed with Deborah Norville
Fortune Fights
Friends Speak
Gangsters: America's Most Evil
Hollywood 911
Hollywood Scandals
How to Survive a Murder
Kicked Out of Hollywood
MLW Underground Wrestling
Murder in the Family with Geraldo Rivera
Murder Made Me Famous
On Patrol: Live
On Patrol: First Shift
The Price of Fame
The Real Story of ...
Scandal Made Me Famous
Serial Psyche
The Story of the Songs (also known in the United Kingdom under the titles Whitney/Madonna/Celine Dion: The Secrets of Her Biggest Hits and Rod Stewart: The Secrets of His Biggest Hits)

Acquired programming

The Amityville Horror Murders
CopsCops Reloaded
Jail
Mobsters
Most Shocking
Steven Seagal: Lawman
Women Behind Bars
Women on Death Row
Worlds Most Evil Killers

Upcoming programming

Netflix

Unabomber: In His Own Words

Former programming
 
3rd Rock from the Sun
Ally McBeal
Becker
Bomb Girls
Beverly Hills Pawn
Branson Taxi
Brothers & Sisters
Carson's Comedy Classics
The Capones
Cheers
Celebrity Close Calls
Celebrity Ghost Stories
Coach
Cold Case Files
Cracked
EP Daily
Fan Addicts!
Final 24
Focus On: Movies
Full Throttle Saloon
Hollywood Dailies
Hollywood Hillbillies
Hollywood's Top Ten
King
Mark at the Movies
Maltin on Movies
Movie Mob
Movies & Music
Naked Trailers
NewsRadio
Night Court
Pacific Blue
Polka Kings
Screen Machines
Secret's Out
Spin City
Storage Hunters
Treasure King
True Justice
The Big Tease
The Countdown
The Critic
The Larry Sanders Show
TMZ Hollywood Sports (now TMZ Sports on Fox Sports 1)
Wings

Miniseries
JFK: The Smoking Gun
The Kennedys
The Kennedys: After Camelot
The Pillars of the Earth
World Without End
Aaron Hernandez's Killing Fields (2020)

Awards ceremonies
1st Critics' Choice Television Awards (on June 22, 2011)
Miss USA 2015

Other services

Reelz HD
Reelz HD is a high definition simulcast of Reelz broadcasting in the 720p resolution format, which launched on August 1, 2010. The first provider to carry the feed was AT&T U-verse, which began carrying ReelzChannel HD on September 27, 2010; Dish Network carried the HD feed as a free preview from March 30 to May 4, 2011. DirecTV began carrying the HD feed on September 26, 2014. DirecTV also carries ReelzChannel's video on demand content in HD. Verizon Fios began carrying the HD feed on March 25, 2017.

ReelzChannel In Your Room
Reelz formerly operated a service for hotels in partnership with LodgeNet, called ReelzChannel In Your Room. This featured a mix of Reelz's original programming with reviews and promotions of films available on a hotel's video on demand service.

References

External links
 

English-language television stations in the United States
Television channels and stations established in 2006
Television networks in the United States
Hubbard Broadcasting
2006 establishments in the United States